Tullahoma is a city in Coffee and Franklin counties in southern Middle Tennessee, United States. The population was 20,339 at the 2020 census. In 2019, the population was estimated to be 19,555. It is the principal city of the Tullahoma micropolitan area (a 2009 estimate placed it at 99,927), which consists of Coffee, Franklin, and Moore counties and is the second largest micropolitan area in Tennessee.

History
Tullahoma was founded in 1852 as a work camp along the new Nashville and Chattanooga Railroad. Its name is derived from the Choctaw language, and means "red rock".

An alternative explanation (see Sam Davis Elliott's Soldier of Tennessee and sources cited therein) of the name is that Peter Decherd, who donated the land for the railroad right-of-way (and was therefore given the right to name two stations along the line), named one station Decherd, after himself, and the other as Tulkahoma (later changed to Tullahoma). Tullahoma was the name of Decherd's favorite horse, which had been named for a Choctaw chief captured by Decherd's grandfather. (There was also a town called Tullahoma in Mississippi, which later changed its name to Grenada.)

The earliest settlement was by farmers from Virginia and North Carolina. Using African-American slave labor, they developed plantations for tobacco and hemp. Slaves also tended their livestock, both horses and cattle. Early families were named Moore, Decherd (pronounced as Deckerd), Anderson, Ragon, Montgomery, Ferrell, Stephenson, and Gunn.

They called a nearby spring Bottle Spring, though it was later known as John Gunn's Spring, since it was on his property. Nowadays, it is called Big Springs. This spring provided water for the steam locomotives. Later it was exploited for health and tourist attractions, as the town developed spa facilities.

When the Civil War began in April 1861, Company B, 1st Regiment of Tennessee Volunteers, was formed in Tullahoma. It joined General Robert E. Lee's Army of Northern Virginia. The division fought in the battles of Bull Run, Fredericksburg, Chancellorsville, Gettysburg, and Petersburg, before surrendering to Union General Ulysses S. Grant at Appomattox.

During the war, Tullahoma served in 1863 as the headquarters for the Confederate Army of Tennessee. That year the Union Army undertook the Tullahoma Campaign, defeating Confederate forces and taking control of Middle Tennessee. Federal troops occupied this area for the duration of the war. As a result of the campaign, Union forces captured Chattanooga.

Tullahoma was little more than a rough frontier outpost, and had no paved streets. 1863 was a wet year, and the place became known to the bedraggled troops of both sides as a place of endless mud. An aide on Confederate General William Hardee's staff is said to have written his own account of the origin of the name: "It is from two Greek words – 'Tulla' meaning mud, and 'Homa,' meaning more mud."

The selection of Tullahoma as a headquarters by Confederate General Braxton Bragg has been much criticized by military historians. Although the location was strategic with regard to the road and rail network, it had no strong natural defenses. Bragg did little to fortify it while his forces occupied the area. Eventually the town was evacuated without a battle.

After the war, Tullahoma recovered slowly, but began to prosper owing to its railroad link. It became renowned for its educational facilities, a rarity in the area at the time.

At the turn of the 20th century, Tullahoma became a popular health destination, with many spas across town to take advantage of Big Springs.

Manufacturing was developed in the area, notably of shoes, clothing, and sporting goods. In 1924, the General Shoe Corporation was established here, which eventually developed as Genesco. The diversified apparel firm is Tennessee's oldest listed firm on the New York Stock Exchange. Since the early 1900s, a variety of sports products have been manufactured in Tullahoma, including baseballs, bats, and golf clubs by Campbell Mfg, Wilsons, Worth Sports, Tennessee Tanning Co. and Rawlings.

In 1939, U.S. Route 41A was built through town. This improved access between the town and Nashville,  to the northwest, and Chattanooga,  to the southeast.

The noted whiskey brand of George Dickel is made in Cascade Hollow, just north of Tullahoma near Normandy, TN.

From the 1930s to mid-20th century, the area benefited from considerable federal investment and development: the projects of the Tennessee Valley Authority constructed dams and related facilities to generate hydroelectric power and electrify many rural areas, as well as providing needed jobs during the Great Depression. Camp Forrest was established during World War II as an infantry training center and later POW camp. The Arnold Engineering Development Complex (AEDC) was constructed near Tullahoma after WWII as a major development and test center for the Air Force and other DOD organizations, as well as NASA.  It was instrumental in the development of numerous aerospace systems, as well development for the Mercury, Gemini, and Apollo space programs.  It remains as the most advanced and largest complex of flight simulation test facilities in the world.  Later the state established two institutions of higher learning here, the Motlow State Community College and an aerospace engineering graduate school, the University of Tennessee Space Institute.

Today manufacturing makes up a smaller part of the Tullahoma economy. The town's growth has been steady though slow since the late 20th century, based on a mixture of education, services, tourism, and retail. The area is a major hub for aerospace, particularly aerospace ground testing, due to the presence of AEDC and the Space Institute.  The former Sverdrup Technology Inc., now a subsidy of Jacobs Engineering, is a major supplier of wind tunnels, test equipment and support.  Microcraft, Inc., which built the first air-breathing flight vehicles to reach Mach 7-10 under the NASA X-43a program, is located near the downtown square.  A national aircraft preservation museum, Beechcraft Heritage Museum, was established on grounds south of the city's municipal airport.

Tullahoma celebrated its 150th (sesquicentennial) anniversary on October 4, 2002.

Rock pioneer Little Richard Penniman died in Tullahoma in 2020.

The town was featured in the song, "Tullahoma Dancing Pizza Man" by Eddie Rabbitt off of the album "Rocky Mountain Music."

Geography
Tullahoma is located in the southwest corner of Coffee County at  (35.368511, -86.213258), and extends south into Franklin County. It is situated at the edge of the Highland Rim, with flatter topography than in the surrounding area. The region was known as "the Barrens" to the first settlers.

Climate
Climate is characterized by relatively high temperatures and evenly distributed precipitation throughout the year. The Köppen Climate Classification subtype for this climate is "Cfa" (Humid Subtropical Climate).

Demographics

2020 census

As of the 2020 United States census, there were 20,339 people, 8,079 households, and 5,181 families residing in the city.

2010 census
As of the 2010 census, there were 18,655 people, 7,717 households, and 5,161 families residing in the city. The racial makeup of the city was 88.1% White, 7.0% African American, 0.2% Native American, 1.2% Asian, 1.1% from other races, and 2.5% from two or more races. Hispanic or Latino of any race were 3.1% of the population.

2000 census
As of the 2000 census, there were 17,994 people, 7,336 households, and 5,039 families residing in the city. The population density was 809.6 people per square mile (312.5/km2). There were 7,890 housing units at an average density of 355.0 per square mile (137.0/km2). The racial makeup of the city was 89.69% White, 6.76% African American, 0.28% Native American, 1.01% Asian, 0.05% Pacific Islander, 0.64% from other races, and 1.57% from two or more races. Hispanic or Latino of any race were 1.71% of the population.

There were 7,336 households, out of which 32.3% had children under the age of 18 living with them, 51.9% were married couples living together, 13.3% had a female householder with no husband present, and 31.3% were non-families. Of all households 27.3% were made up of individuals, and 11.8% had someone living alone who was 65 years of age or older. The average household size was 2.42 and the average family size was 2.94.

In the city, the population was spread out, with 25.4% under the age of 18, 8.6% from 18 to 24, 26.9% from 25 to 44, 23.0% from 45 to 64, and 16.1% who were 65 years of age or older. The median age was 38 years. For every 100 females, there were 90.5 males. For every 100 females age 18 and over, there were 85.6 males.

The median income for a household in the city was $34,119, and the median income for a family was $39,797. Males had a median income of $33,662 versus $20,962 for females. The per capita income for the city was $20,002. About 14.2% of families and 17.2% of the population were below the poverty line, including 25.0% of those under age 18 and 13.0% of those age 65 or over.

Performing arts

The Annual 41A Music Festival hosts local music talent and national artists. South Jackson Civic Center hosts the South Jackson Civic Association, P.A.C.T. (Performing Arts for Children and Teens), and Community Playhouse, Inc. All three organizations produce multiple shows annually.

Education
Tullahoma hosts two state institutions of higher learning, Motlow State Community College and the University of Tennessee Space Institute.

K–12 public education is provided through a city school system.

Tullahoma High School "Wildcat" athletic teams compete in the TSSAA in public school divisions.

Transportation
The Tullahoma Regional Airport was originally constructed in 1942 for the U. S. Army Air Corps. It features wide heavy duty runways, a large ramp, taxiways and large hangars. Over 100 aircraft are presently based at the airport, with additional capacity available. Over 2,000 transient aircraft visit the airport annually.

The Tullahoma depot continued as a busy passenger train station for the Nashville, Chattanooga & St. Louis Railway into the 1950s. The Dixie Flyer (St. Louis & Chicago – various Florida points, service discontinued, 1965), Dixieland (St. Louis & Chicago – various Florida points, service discontinued, 1957) and Georgian (St. Louis & Chicago – Atlanta) all made stops at the station. Service continued after the Louisville and Nashville Railroad absorbed the NCStL in 1957. The Georgian continued to 1968; however, the L&N maintained an unnamed Evansville – Nashville – Atlanta successor train until April 30, 1971, after which Amtrak absorbed L&N passenger operations.  The Nashville to Atlanta route is being studied for reactivation as of February 2023. 

Several state routes pass through Tullahoma, including, 16 (US 41A), 55, 130 and 269.

Notable people

Dewon Brazelton, baseball player, born in Tullahoma  
Eric Clutton, resided in Tullahoma; popularly known as Doctor Diesel, he was a renowned designer of aeromodels and the FRED experimental aircraft.
Gary Flandro, a key NASA scientist in the planning and execution of the Voyager missions to the outer planets and beyond, is the Boling Chair of Excellence in Space Propulsion for UTSI and also works as a consultant in Tullahoma.
Isham G. Harris, politician and former Tennessee governor, born near Tullahoma
David Hess, baseball player, born in Tullahoma
Little Richard, rock and roll pioneer, lived in Tullahoma at the time of his death in 2020.
Antonio London, football player, born in Tullahoma
Dustin Lynch, country singer, born in Tullahoma
Steve Matthews, football player, born in Tullahoma
Bryan Morris, baseball player, born in Tullahoma
Jordan Sheffield, baseball player, born in Tullahoma
Justus Sheffield, baseball player, born in Tullahoma, brother of Jordan Sheffield
Jimmy Valiant, professional wrestler, born near Tullahoma
Ally Walker, actress, born in Tullahoma 
Thomas A. Wiseman, judge and politician, born in Tullahoma

References

External links

 
 Tullahoma city schools
 Think Tullahoma, City of Tullahoma Economic Development Corporation
 City charter
 The Tullahoma Campaign in the Tennessee Encyclopedia of History and Culture

1852 establishments in Tennessee
Cities in Coffee County, Tennessee
Cities in Franklin County, Tennessee
Cities in Tennessee
Populated places established in 1852
Tullahoma, Tennessee micropolitan area
List of place names of Choctaw origin in the United States